Maria Kowalska (born 19 May 1929) is a Polish alpine skier. She competed at the 1952 Winter Olympics and the 1956 Winter Olympics.

References

1929 births
Living people
Polish female alpine skiers
Olympic alpine skiers of Poland
Alpine skiers at the 1952 Winter Olympics
Alpine skiers at the 1956 Winter Olympics
Sportspeople from Zakopane
20th-century Polish women